Molla Jonud (also Romanized as Mollā Jonūd) is a village in Qarah Su Rural District, in the Central District of Khoy County, West Azerbaijan Province, Iran. At the 2006 census, its population was 777, in 144 families.

References 

Populated places in Khoy County